Charlie Canet (8 September 1895 – 11 February 1978) was a former Australian rules footballer who played with Carlton in the Victorian Football League (VFL).

Canet coached Sale to premierships in 1924 and 1927 in the Gippsland Football League.

After successfully coaching Nathalia to the 1923 Goulburn Valley Football Association premiership and Maffra, Sale and Kyabram, Canet was appointed as coach of the Carlton Reserves in 1940.

Notes

External links 

Charlie Canet's profile at Blueseum

1895 births
Australian rules footballers from Victoria (Australia)
Carlton Football Club players
1978 deaths
People from Shepparton
Sale Football Club coaches